Faithlife Corporation publishes and creates electronic tools and resources for Bible study. It produces the Logos Bible Software, but also publishes tools and resources under a number of other brands, and partners with more than 500 publishers to offer over 120,000 Christian ebooks available to users of its software.

History 

Founded in 1992 as Logos Research Systems, Inc., when two Microsoft employees, Bob Pritchett and Kiernon Reiniger, along with Bob’s father, Dale Pritchett quit their jobs to develop Christian software. Their first product was called Logos Bible Software for Microsoft Windows. For nearly 20 years this was the company's only major product, but more recently they have diversified into a number of other products and services. In October 2014, to reflect this change, the company was rebranded as Faithlife Corporation. In October 2022, the company announced they are refining their strategic direction, exiting church management functionality and other parts of Faithlife Equip, and instead focus on Bible study tools, content delivery, and digital discipleship. The current CEO of Faithlife is Vik Rajagopal.

Products and Services

Logos Bible Software 

Logos Bible Software is a digital library application designed for electronic Bible study, and is available for Windows, Mac OS, iOS and Android.

Publishing and Imprints

Lexham Press 
Lexham Press is the in-house publishing imprint of Faithlife, LLC. They specialize in books that draw from the Christian tradition and the global church to provide resources for pastors, scholars, parents, and students of the Bible. As part of the Faithlife (the makers of Logos Bible Software), Lexham Press seeks to increase biblical literacy, thoughtful reflection, and faithful Christian action around the world.

References

1992 establishments in Washington (state)
American companies established in 1992
Publishing companies established in 1992
Software companies established in 1992
Companies based in Bellingham, Washington
Christian publishing companies
Magazine publishing companies of the United States
Software companies based in Washington (state)